Artemisia campestris is a common and widespread species of plants in the sunflower family, Asteraceae. It is native to a wide region of Eurasia and North America. Common names include field wormwood, beach wormwood, northern wormwood, Breckland wormwood, boreal wormwood, Canadian wormwood, field sagewort and field mugwort.

It grows in open sites on dry sandy soils, in steppes, rocky slopes, and waste areas.

Subspecies
The following subspecies are accepted:
Artemisia campestris subsp. borealis (Pall.) H.M.Hall & Clem.
Artemisia campestris subsp. bottnica Lundstr. ex Kindb.
Artemisia campestris subsp. campestris
Artemisia campestris subsp. canadensis (Michx.) Scoggan
Artemisia campestris subsp. caudata (Michx.) H.M.Hall & Clem.
Artemisia campestris subsp. cinerea
Artemisia campestris subsp. glutinosa (Gay ex Bess.) Batt.
Artemisia campestris subsp. lednicensis (Spreng.) Greuter & Raab-Straube
Artemisia campestris subsp. pacifica H.M.Hall & Clem.
Artemisia campestris subsp. variabilis (Ten.) Greuter

References

External links
 
LuontoPortti Naturegate
Tree of Life
On-line Atlas of the British & Irish Flora
Electronic Atlas of the Flora of British Columbia
Pollen Library

campestris
Flora of North America
Flora of Europe
Flora of Asia
Plants described in 1753
Taxa named by Carl Linnaeus